César Gaviria Trujillo Airport  is an airport serving the town of Inírida in the Guainía Department of Colombia. The airport is named in honor of César Gaviria Trujillo, a former President of Colombia and  Secretary General of the Organization of American States.

The Puerto Inirida VOR-DME (Ident: PDA) is located on the field.

Airlines and destinations

See also
Transport in Colombia
List of airports in Colombia

References

External links
OpenStreetMap - Inírida
OurAirports - Obando
SkyVector - Obando
FallingRain - Obando Airport

Airports in Colombia
Buildings and structures in Guainía Department